Thrille Cine is a horror TV movie which originally aired on ABS-CBN on November 2, 2008.

Plot
Sekreto Ni Secret Admirer (Secret Admirer's Secret)
Tikboy (Zanjoe Marudo), an ugly, shy, but kind-hearted mailman who is in love with Helen (Roxanne Guinoo), a woman mending a broken heart.  Tikboy feels embarrassed to approach Helen because of his appearance; hence he decides to send her anonymous love letters.  But when Helen starts to fall madly in love with the fictitious admirer, Tikboy gets caught in a more complicated web of lies.

Karera Sa Promosyon (Race To A Promotion)
Karera Sa Promosyon, follows Perez (Gerald Anderson), a young cop, who set to get a promotion.  He believes that getting a promotion will enable him to influence fellow policemen to lead honest lives.  As Perez gives his best to solve murder cases, he soon discovers a disturbing police secret.

Cast

Sekreto Ni Secret Admirer (Secret Admirer's Secret)
Zanjoe Marudo as Tikboy
Roxanne Guinoo as Helen
Niña Jose

Karera Sa Promosyon (Race To A Promotion)
Gerald Anderson as Jesse Perez
Dominic Ochoa
Cholo Barreto
Maui Taylor as Shirley
Gerald Acao as Simon
Bembol Roco as Chief of Police

See also
 List of shows previously aired by ABS-CBN

References

ABS-CBN original programming
2008 television specials